Canela Preta Biological Reserve is a biological reserve in Santa Catarina, Brazil.
It is home to vulnerable species of trees, and is closed to the public.

History

The reserve, which lies in the municipalities of Botuverá and Nova Trento, was founded on 20 June 1980 by decree 11,232.
The reserve is named after the predominant Ocotea catharinensis of the area.
The site is covered by Atlantic Forest. 
The region is hilly, with many valleys whose streams flow into the Itajaí-Açu and Tijucas rivers.

Status

As of 2009 the State Biological Reserve was a "strict nature reserve" under IUCN protected area category Ia.
Since it is home to species of vegetation that are disappearing in the state, the site is closed to the public.
It serves as an important genetic reserve and an area for scientific research.

Bird Species

Bird species recorded at the reserve include Scale-throated hermit, Pileated parrot, Black-capped foliage-gleaner, Pale-browed treehunter, Streaked xenops, Olivaceous woodcreeper, Dusky-tailed antbird, White-shouldered fire-eye, Speckle-breasted antpitta, Greenish tyrannulet, Fuscous flycatcher, Blue manakin, Greenish schiffornis, Chestnut-crowned becard, Rufous-browed peppershrike, Golden-rumped euphonia and Red-crowned ant tanager.

References

Sources

1980 establishments in Brazil
Biological reserves of Brazil
Protected areas of Santa Catarina (state)
Protected areas established in 1980
Protected areas of the Atlantic Forest